The Roland V-Synth is a polyphonic synthesizer. It was released 2003 and was Roland's flagship synthesizer at the time. It combines multiple oscillator technologies and a built in sampler. It also features an arpeggiator and COSM filtering to aid the creation of new sounds.

Features
 Touch screen
 TimeTrip Pad allows realtime manipulation of waveforms
 V-LINK Onboard Video Control
 Twin D Beams

Construction
Built in a black metal case it has plastic end cheeks. The buttons on the unit are backlit.

Models
 V-Synth XT 2005 - Rack-mount module (minus D-Beams and Trip Pad). Pre-installed with Roland's VC-1 (D-50 emulator) and VC-2 (Vocal Designer)
 V-Synth GT 2007 - Adds Roland's Vocal Designer technology. Has a maximum 28 voices of polyphony.

Notable users
 BT
 Asia
 Crystal Castles
 Enigma
 Ladytron
 Orbital
 Jens Johansson
 Jesper Kyd
 Jordan Rudess
 Michael Pinnella
 Richard Barbieri
 Nick Rhodes

References

Further reading

External links
 https://www.roland.com/global/products/v-synth/

Roland synthesizers
D-Beam
MIDI instruments
Polyphonic synthesizers
Japanese musical instruments
Japanese inventions